Prem Mhanje Prem Mhanje Prem Asta (Marathi: प्रेम म्हणजे प्रेम म्हणजे प्रेम असतं) is a Marathi drama film released on 19 April 2013. Produced by Sachin Parekar and directed by Mrinal Dev-Kulkarni. The film stars are Mrinal Dev-Kulkarni, Sachin Khedekar, Pallavi Joshi, Sunil Barve, Suhas Joshi, Mohan Agashe and Smita Talwalkar. The film's music is by Milind Ingle and Surel Ingle.

The film is based on the connection between love and marriage.

Plot
The movie is a heart-warming story of two different individuals who at one point in their lives were married. A single mother along with her two daughters live with her mother-in-law. Her husband had abandoned them 4 years ago, but staying in the same city had never bothered to check on his family. The only thing he did in those 4 years was to send divorce papers, which his wife has not signed.

Other side of the story revolves around a doctor who is a father to two kids. His ex-wife had to choose between staying home with family or career in USA and she chose career. But she never let the divorce hamper the relation she shares with her ex-husband. But this incident had definitely made her ex-husband depressed and alone.

One eventful day at their kids school gets them together and a conversation begins, which blooms into something amazing. Until there is a twist in the tale.

Cast
 Mrinal Dev-Kulkarni
 Sachin Khedekar
 Pallavi Joshi
 Sunil Barve
 Suhas Joshi
 Mohan Agashe
 Smita Talwalkar
Ritika Shrotri

Crew
Director - Mrinal Dev-Kulkarni
Story - Mrinal Dev-Kulkarni
Producer - Sachin Parekar
Cinematographer - Amlendu Chaudhary
Art Director - Vinod Gunaji and Nitin Borkar
Music Director - Milind Ingle and Surel Ingle
Lyricist - Kishore Kadam

Soundtrack
The music has been directed by Milind Ingle and Surel Ingle, while the lyrics have been provided by Kishore Kadam.

Track listing

References 

2013 films
2010s Marathi-language films